Eran Shakine  (born 19 February 1962) is an Israeli artist, painter, illustrator and sculptor.

Biography 

Shakine was born in Tel Aviv to Shimon (writer) and Esther (designer), holocaust survivors who immigrated to Israel after World War II. In 1980, he graduated from WIZO-France High School of Arts, in Tel Aviv. On his recruitment to the IDF in 1980, he joined the Nahal Command and served as a graphic designer. In 1983 he studied Art History at Tel Aviv University and in 1984 began his studies at the art school École des Beaux-Arts in Paris.

Between the years 1986–1993, Shakine lived in New York, where he was granted fellowship of "Art Matters" and was the assistant to CoBrA avant-garde movement artist, Karl Appel. From 1997 to 2001, Shakine lived in London. 

In his works, Shakine creates bold portraits which present prominent culture figures in unusual situations and contexts, among them: Freud dozing in his famous armchair, Picasso frying an egg; Pete Mondrian crossing the ocean in dog paddle swimming style.

Shakine's Solo exhibitions were presented in New York, London, Paris, Toronto, the Israel Museum in Jerusalem, Tel Aviv Museum of Art, Museum of Israeli Art in Ramat Gan, Herzliya Museum, the Gallery of New York University, Newton Center in Boston, Corcoran art museum in Washington, D.C., Forum Museum in St. Louis, the Jewish Museum in Berlin, the Jewish Museums in Munich and in Brussels.

His works are displayed in the permanent collection of the "British Museum" in London, the Ludwig Museum in Germany, Tel Aviv Museum of Art, Israel Museum, Tefen Open Museum, Herzliya Museum and Ein Harod Museum.

In 2014, Shakine presented, for the first time at the Haifa Museum, his solo exhibition "Culture Hero" through which he tried to figure out how culture heroes are created. The exhibition: Three Painters, a rock star, a young girl and a psychoanalyst in one room, was presented in early 2016 at MANA Center for Contemporary Art in New Jersey and at Haifa Museum of Art. 
In 2017, Shakine exhibited a large solo exhibition at the Jewish Museum in Berlin, (Germany).

Shakine's art always engages in the same subject, even though his artworks look different from one another.

Personal life 
Shakine is married with three children and lives in Tel Aviv.

His books 

 Sunny Side Up, Hirmer publishing house, July 2011
 Good Help Is Hard To Find, self publishing, June 2011
 Graffiti Girl, Hirmer publishing house, May 2014
 A Muslim, a Christian and a Jew, Hirmer publishing house, October 2016

Awards 
 1989–1990 – Art Matters Foundation: a non-profit private foundation supporting original and contemporary artists. 
 2004 – Portraits painting on the facade of the Tel Aviv Municipality building.

Exhibitions

Solo exhibitions 

 2011 – "Good Help Is Hard To Find…”
 2012 – "Sunny Side Up
 2014 – "Graffiti Girl
 2016 – "Looking at You / Talking To Myself"
 2016 – "Three Painters, A Rock Star, A Young Girl and a Psychoanalyst in One Room"
 2016 –  "A Muslim A Christian and a Jew

Art in the public space 

 Gan Kinneret, Kfar Saba
 College of Management, Rishon Lezion
 The Cliff Park, (Gan Hatsuk) Netanya
 Ashdod Park, Ashdod
 Artists' House, Tel Aviv
 Rothschild Boulevard, Tel Aviv
 The Plaza Tower Museum, Tel Aviv
 "You and Me", Metropolitan tower plaza, Warsaw
 Rothschild Tower, Richard Meier
 Girl from buda, Budapest
 Billboard project, Munich

Group exhibitions

Art fairs

References

External links 
 Eran Shakine's website
 THE KEEN MIND OF ERAN SHAKINE
 Artist Information

1962 births
Living people
People from Tel Aviv
Israeli expatriates in England
Tel Aviv University alumni
21st-century Israeli painters
Israeli illustrators
21st-century Israeli sculptors
Israeli expatriates in the United States